The Führer Headquarters, abbreviated FHQ, were a number of official headquarters used by the Nazi leader Adolf Hitler and various other German commanders and officials throughout Europe during the Second World War. The last one used, the Führerbunker in Berlin, where Hitler committed suicide on 30 April 1945, is the most widely known headquarter. Other notable headquarters are the Wolfsschanze (Wolf's Lair) in East Prussia, where Claus von Stauffenberg in league with other conspirators attempted to assassinate Hitler on 20 July 1944, and Hitler's private home, the Berghof, at Obersalzberg near Berchtesgaden, where he frequently met with prominent foreign and domestic officials.

Introduction

At the beginning of World War II there were no permanent headquarters constructed for the Führer. Hitler visited the frontlines using either airplanes or his special train, the Führersonderzug; thus, the Führersonderzug can be considered as the first of his field headquarters. The first permanent installation which became a Führer Headquarters was the Felsennest, which was used by Hitler during the Battle of France in May, 1940. Hitler actually spent very little time in Berlin during the war, and the dwellings he most frequently used were the Berghof and the Wolfsschanze, spending more than 800 days at the latter.

The Führer Headquarters were especially designed to work as command facilities for the Führer, which meant all necessary demands were taken into consideration; communications, conference rooms, safety measures, bunkers, guard facilities etc. were prepared accordingly. Even Berghof and the Obersalzberg complex were modified and extended with considerable defense facilities (bunkers, guard posts etc.). The Wehrmachtbericht, a daily propaganda broadcast covering the war, was also transmitted from the Führer Headquarters.

The Fuhrerhauptquartiere programme used over one million cubic metres of concrete, more than half at Anlage Riese and Wolfsschlucht II. Forced labourers worked for nearly twelve million working days; two-thirds at Anlage Riese, Wolfsschlucht II and Wolfsschanze. 

The Führer Headquarters cannot be considered as strict military headquarters; the Wehrmacht had their own, distinctly located in other places, yet often in the vicinity of the FHQs. Nevertheless, because Hitler directly controlled much of the German war effort, the FHQs more often than not became de facto military headquarters. In reality, Nazi Germany's military command during the war generally rested upon Hitler's directives, while the rest of the military command structure, especially the Oberkommando der Wehrmacht (OKW) (directly controlled by Hitler) was reduced to executing his decisions, as compared to most other nations' command structures, which generally had more independence in decision-making.

Terminology

Every place Hitler stayed cannot be considered as a Führer Headquarters, and he did not stay at every official FHQ.
Furthermore, some sources may not refer to the Berghof and the Führerbunker as official German Führerhauptquartiere at that time in history, but both of them became de facto Führer Headquarters; thus, they are historically often referred to as such.

The Berghof was modified in much the same way as other FHQs, and Hitler had daily conferences on military matters there in the latter part of the war. The "Eagle's Nest", i.e. the Kehlsteinhaus, was rarely used and may not be considered a FHQ as such alone; however, it was associated with the Berghof and part of the Obersalzberg military complex.

It became a de facto Führer Headquarters during the Battle of Berlin, and ultimately, the last of his headquarters.

Headquarters locations
There were about 14 known completed Führer Headquarters (of about 20 planned):

Special train (Führersonderzug)

The Führersonderzug train was named Führersonderzug "Amerika" in 1940, and later Führersonderzug "Brandenburg". The train was used as a headquarters until the Balkans Campaign. Afterwards, the train was not used as Führer Headquarters, however Hitler continued to travel on it throughout the war between Berlin, Berchtesgaden, Munich and other headquarters.

See also
 National Redoubt (the supposed Nazi "Alpenfestung" (Alpine Fortress))
 Nazi architecture
 Vorbunker
 Map over places

References
Notes

Bibliography

 Hansen, Hans-Josef: Felsennest - Das vergessene Führerhauptquartier in der Eifel. Bau, Nutzung, Zerstörung. Aachen 2006, Helios-Verlag, .
 Kuffner, Alexander: Zeitreiseführer Eifel 1933-45. Helios, Aachen 2007, .

 Raiber, Richard, Guide to Hitler's Headquarters, After the Battle, No.19, Special Edition, Battle of Britain International Ltd, 1977, London
 Ramsey, Winston G. (editor) & Posch, Tom (researcher), The Berlin Führerbunker: The Thirteenth Hole, After the Battle, No.61, Special Edition, Battle of Britain International Ltd, 1988, London
 Pierre Rhode/Werner Sünkel: Wolfsschlucht 2 – Autopsie eines Führerhauptquartiers, Verlag Werner Sünkel Geschichte+Technik, Leinburg 1993, 
 Werner Sünkel/Rudolf Rack/Pierre Rhode: Adlerhorst – Autopsie eines Führerhauptquartiers, Verlag Werner Sünkel Geschichte +Technik, Offenhausen 1998, 
 von Loringhoven, Bernd Freytag/d’Alançon, François: Mit Hitler im Bunker. Aufzeichnungen aus dem Führerhauptquartier Juli 1944 – April 1945. Berlin 2005, wjs-Verlag, .
 Schulz, Alfons: Drei Jahre in der Nachrichtenzentrale des Führerhauptquartiers. Christiana-Verlag, Stein am Rhein. 2. Aufl. 1997. .
 Seidler, Franz W./Zeigert, Dieter : Die Führerhauptquartiere. Anlagen und Planungen im Zweiten Weltkrieg. München: Herbig 2000. .

External links

 Bundesarchiv – Der Kommandant Führerhauptquartiere

 
Fuehrer Headquarters
Fuehrer Headquarters
Fuehrer Headquarters
Forts in Belarus
Forts in France
Forts in Germany
Forts in Poland
Forts in Russia
Military of Nazi Germany
Armoured trains